The Enoch Pratt Free Library is the free public library system of Baltimore, Maryland. Its Central Library and office headquarters are located on 400 Cathedral Street (southbound) and occupy the northeastern three quarters of a city block bounded by West Franklin Street (U.S. Route 40 westbound) to the north, Cathedral Street to the east, West Mulberry Street (U.S. Route 40 eastbound) to the south, and Park Avenue (northbound) to the west. Located on historic Cathedral Hill, north of downtown, the library is also in the Mount Vernon-Belvedere-Mount Royal neighborhood and cultural and historic district.

The Cathedral Street Main Library is the flagship of the entire Enoch Pratt Free Library system, now with twenty-two community / neighborhood and regional branches, it was designated the "Maryland State Library Resource Center" by the General Assembly of Maryland in 1971. The center operates as the state library for Maryland. A state agency oversees the center.

History 
Its establishment began on January 21, 1882 when the longtime local hardware merchant, banking, and steamship company executive and philanthropist Enoch Pratt (1808-1896) offered a gift of a central library, four branch libraries (with two additional shortly afterward), and a financial endowment of more than $1 million in a significant piece of correspondence, letter of offer to Mayor William Pinkney Whyte and the Baltimore City Council. His intention was to establish a public circulating library that (as he described it) "shall be for all, rich and poor without distinction of race or color, who, when properly accredited, can take out the books if they will handle them carefully and return them." The grant was soon accepted by the municipal government and approved by the voters in an election on October 25, 1882.

One of the early hires at the library was William A. Williams, the first Black Catholic seminarian in America (who later dropped out due to the prevailing racist attitudes of the day).

From 1993 to August 11, 2016, Carla Hayden (formerly of the Chicago Public Library) served as the CEO of Enoch Pratt Free Library in Baltimore and since then has been the Librarian of Congress in Washington, DC. Hayden and the staff of the Pennsylvania Avenue branch were praised for keeping open the library on Monday April 27, 2015 during the protests and the civil strife over the death of Freddie Gray. The library's location, at the intersection of Pennsylvania and West North Avenues in the northwest center city Sandtown-Winchester community, found itself at the center of the protests drawing nationwide and international attention, giving community members a safe place during the troubled times.

Following Hayden's departure and promotion on August 11, 2016, the acting director of the library has been Gordon Krabbe, who served as the library's chief operating officer since 1989.

In July 2017, Heidi Daniel was named the new president and CEO of the public library system.

In June 2022, it was reported that workers across the Pratt Library system announced a plan to form a union named Pratt Workers United with AFSCME Council 67, representing over 300 workers across the system, calling for improved wages, benefits, career advancement, and increased staff input on their work environment. The council would also represent workers at Baltimore Museum of Art and Walters Art Museum if union campaigns at those institutions are successful. Workers within the library system have been organizing for a union since May 2021.

Central Library building

Original (1886–2015)

The merchant and financier Enoch Pratt, in a letter to the Baltimore City Council on January 21, 1882, offered to donate and construct a free public library with several neighborhood branches open to all the citizens of the City of Baltimore (and its surrounding environs). After some debate and discussion which was also widely reported in the local newspapers, the mayor and council accepted the gift and the terms of its conditions later that year, which were subsequently approved by the citizens in a referendum held during an election that October, 1882.  Construction of a Central Library began later that year. The original Central Library building opened on January 5, 1886 . Part of Pratt's donation to the city, it was originally valued at approximately $250,000 and was accompanied by the gift of initially four other neighborhood branches in the quadrants of the city which also opened that year and were soon joined by two others, along with an endowment of $1.058 million (in 1880s money). However, always a very thrifty man, Mr. Pratt provided that the bricks from the three 1820s-era townhouses that were to be demolished for his new city library were to be knocked off, cleaned and re-used in constructing a parish house and hall for his church, the First Independent Church of Baltimore, now the First Unitarian Church of Baltimore.

Designed by Charles L. Carson, "Old Central" occupied a fraction of the same plot of land as its successor 47 years later, facing West Mulberry Street near the corner of Cathedral Street. The structure's elaborate Romanesque Revival architecture became a target of criticism from journalists during  final years of existence: H. L. Mencken of The Baltimore Sun, a frequent and prolific user of the branch at Calhoun and Hollins Streets, judged it "so infernally hideous that it ought to be pulled down by the common hangman"

Current
By the late 1920s, Old Central could no longer hold the library's continually expanding collection, even though an annex had been added at the rear. Baltimore City voters approved a loan for $3 million by an almost 3-to-1 margin on May 3, 1927. The Central Pratt Library's staff, services and 400,000 volumes were relocated to temporary quarters at the old Rouse-Hempstone Building at West Redwood Street and Hopkins Place (now the site of the Royal Farms Arena for a two-year stay during 1931–1933. At this temporary location, the Central Pratt was able to reorganize and plan for its future arrangements of departments and try out its soon-to-be famous "department store windows" displays  It was razed in 1931, along with several townhouses facing Cathedral Street, including a significant one formerly owned by Robert Goodloe Harper.

The replacement structure occupies the entire block facing the Old Baltimore Cathedral. Construction began in June 1931, during the darkest, most difficult days of the financial Great Depression and along with other major construction projects occurring at that time with the building of a new U.S. Courthouse and Post Office at Battle Monument Square at North Calvert and East Lexington-Fayette Streets, and the new Municipal Office Building on Holliday Street, across from the old Baltimore City Hall and the new Federal Courthouse/Post Office, offered an important source of desperately needed employment to the hundreds of out-of-work citizens of the city.

The architects were C. and N. Friz, with consulting architects Tilton & Githens from New York.  The building was completed in January 1933, and opened to the public on February 3, with a record of not one day of suspended service since the original beginnings of "Enoch Pratt's Folly" on January 5, 1886. In Spring of 2016, ground was broken on a $115 million restoration of the historic Central Library. The building remains open to the public. February 11–19, the Central Library closed to the public to relocate departments to the newly renovated upper floors, and to begin renovation of the lower levels. The restoration was expected to be complete in the fall of 2019.

In 2020, the Senator Barbara A. Mikulski Room, with mementos and Mikulski's Presidential Medal of Freedom, was opened in the Central Library.

Maryland Department

The Maryland Department, located on the second floor of the 2004 Annex, contains many of the library's prized collections.  These include 275,000 mounted documents (mostly newspaper articles), 2100 maps, 6000 pieces of ephemera, and 24,000 photographs, all relevant to Maryland and Maryland history. The Maryland Department also has a room full of books pertaining to Maryland, with an emphasis on Baltimore.

Most materials in the Maryland Department are non-circulating but available for patrons to examine.

Statistics

In 2010, there were two million visits to Pratt, a 58% increase over the previous two years — more people than attended Ravens games.
Pratt's award-winning website got 2.6 million hits.
106,000 children, teens and their families participated in child and teen programs.
Children and teens read 220,000 books in the Summer Reading Program.
There are 600 computers available system-wide for public use.

Branches
Pratt's branches serve the unique needs of patrons in their neighborhoods. For example, the Southeast Anchor Library has a program for new speakers of English and Spanish to practice their conversation skills informally.
There are 21 branches across the city of Baltimore, as well as three mobile units.  In 2018, the Pratt expanded service hours by more than 30 percent across the system.
Branches include Brooklyn
Canton,
Clifton,
Edmondson Avenue,
Forest Park,
Govans,
Hamilton,
Hampden,
Herring Run,
Light Street,
Northwood,
Orleans Street,
Patterson Park,
Pennsylvania Avenue, 
Reisterstown Road,
Roland Park,
Southeast Anchor,
Walbrook,
Washington Village, 
and Waverly.

See also

Edgar Allan Poe
George Peabody Library

References

External links
 Enoch Pratt Free Library website
 Maryland Digital Cultural Heritage website
 Explore Baltimore Heritage - Enoch Pratt Free Library Central Library

Further reading
 
 
 

Education in Baltimore
Public libraries in Maryland
Buildings and structures in Baltimore
Mount Vernon, Baltimore
Libraries established in 1882
1882 establishments in Maryland
Edward Lippincott Tilton buildings